Piperskärr is a locality situated in Västervik Municipality, Kalmar County, Sweden with 551 inhabitants as of 2010.

References 

Populated places in Kalmar County
Populated places in Västervik Municipality